Henry H. Marshall (born August 9, 1954), is a former professional American football player who was selected by the Kansas City Chiefs in the 3rd round of the 1976 NFL Draft. A 6'2", 212-lb. wide receiver from the University of Missouri, Marshall played his entire NFL career with the Chiefs from 1976 to 1987.

A model of consistency throughout his career, Henry Marshall came to the Chiefs as a third-round draft pick from the University of Missouri in 1976 and stayed for 12 productive seasons. Overcoming the label of a "bad hands" receiver early on, he became Kansas City's top receiver for most of his career.

Paul Wiggin, Marshall's first coach with the Chiefs, described the wide receiver as "a super kid who can be a premier player." Marshall became just that, and by the time he called it quits, he had caught 416 passes for 6,545 yards.

Marshall's climb to the top of the Chiefs' receiving records was not easy. The Chiefs had very poor teams in Marshall's first five seasons, and the most passes he caught in that time frame was just 28, and that was in his rookie season. and when Marv Levy took over the team in 1978, he installed a running offense, limiting Marshall's offensive contributions.

He had a breakout year in 1980 when the Chiefs returned to a pro-style offense. Marshall hauled in 47 receptions for 799 yards and 6 touchdowns and was one of the team's premier receivers through 1986. His best season was 1984 as he totaled 912 yards on 62 catches. For his career, Marshall played in 165 games for Kansas City and scored 35 touchdowns.

Marshall ranks second all-time for receptions in Chiefs history behind Tony Gonzalez.

References

1954 births
Living people
American football wide receivers
Missouri Tigers football players
Kansas City Chiefs players
People from Coffee County, Georgia